The 1994–95 Football League Trophy, known as the 1994–95 Auto Windscreens Shield, was the ninth staging of the Football League Trophy, a knock-out competition for English football clubs in the Second Division and the Third Division. The winners were Birmingham City and the runners-up were Carlisle United. This was the first trophy in Birmingham's "lower-league Double" of the Football League Second Division and Football League Trophy.

The competition began on 27 September 1994 and ended with the final on 23 April 1995 at Wembley Stadium.

In the first round, there were two sections split into seven groups: North and South. In the following rounds each section gradually eliminates teams in knock-out fashion until each has a winning finalist. At this point, the two winning finalists face each other in the combined final for the honour of the trophy.

First round

Northern Section 
Stockport County and Scarborough given byes to the second round

Southern Section 
Shrewsbury Town and Wycombe Wanderers given byes to the second round.

Second round

Northern Section

Southern Section

Quarter-finals

Northern Section

Southern Section

Area semi-finals

Northern Section

Southern Section

Area finals

Northern Area final

Southern Area final

Final

Notes
General
statto.com

Specific

EFL Trophy
Tro